Aghjabadi is a city in and the capital of the Aghjabadi District of Azerbaijan. It is situated in central Azerbaijan.

Notable natives 
 Uzeyir Hajibeyov — composer. He is recognized as the father of Azerbaijani classical music and opera. Uzeyir Hajibeyov composed music for the national anthem of Azerbaijan and the state anthem of Azerbaijan SSR. He is the first Muslim author of an opera; People's Artist of USSR (1948).
 Vilayat Guliyev — Minister of Foreign Affairs of Azerbaijan (1999–2004).

Twin towns 
  Batumi, Georgia
  Rize, Turkey

References

External links
 

Populated places in Aghjabadi District